

Places
Cebu is an island province of the Philippines located in the Central Visayas (Region VII) region.

Cebu may also refer to:
 Cebu City, an independent highly urbanized city and the capital of the island province of Cebu
 Metro Cebu or Cebu Metropolitan Area, the metropolitan area centered on Cebu City
 Cebu Strait, a strait in Central Visayas

Others
 Cebu Pacific, Philippine low-cost airline
 USS Cebu (ARG-6), a 1943 Luzon-class engine repair ship
 Cebu (novel), by Peter Bacho
 Cebu (animal), variant spelling of the cattle known as Zebu

See also
 Sibu (disambiguation)
 Cebuano (disambiguation)